The Women's ski big air competition at the FIS Freestyle Ski and Snowboarding World Championships 2021 was held on 16 March. A qualification was held on 15 March 2021.

Qualification
The qualification was started on 15 March at 13:20. The best eight skiers qualified for the final.

Final
The final was started on 16 March at 10:00.

References

Women's ski big air